Shirley Jones (born 1934) is an American actress and singer.

Shirley Jones may also refer to:

 Shirley Jones (R&B singer), an American singer from Detroit
 Shirley Brannock Jones (born 1925), a former United States federal judge
 Shirley M. Jones (1939–2016), an American politician and parks and recreation employee
 Shirley Jones (WRAF officer), a British military officer

See also
Inside Information Stakes, an American Thoroughbred horse race previously run as the Shirley Jones Stakes (1976 and 1979) and the Shirley Jones Handicap (1981–2009)